Felsner is a German language habitational surname for someone who lived in a rocky place or by a cliff (Fels). Notable people with the name include:
 Brian Felsner (1972), American former professional ice hockey left winger
 Denny Felsner (1970), American former professional ice hockey winger
 Hermann Felsner (1889–1977), Austrian football player and manager
 Johannes Felsner (1998), Austrian football player

References 

German-language surnames
Toponymic surnames